R400 road  may refer to:
 R400 road (Ireland)
 R400 road (South Africa)